Ferrera is a municipality in the Viamala Region in the Grisons, Switzerland. It was formed on 1 January 2008 through the merger of Innerferrera and Ausserferrera.  Geographically, it covers the entire Ferrera valley.

Historical population
The combined historical population of the two municipalities is given in the following table:

 Population increase due to construction of the dam at Valle di Lei

Languages

Weather
Innerferrera village in Ferrera has an average of 118.2 days of rain per year and on average receives  of precipitation. During this month there is precipitation for an average of 12.2 days. The month with the most days of precipitation is May, with an average of 13.3, but with only  of precipitation.

References

External links 

 Official Web site